Kuentz is a German surname that may refer to
 Charles Kuentz (Egyptologist) (1895–1978), American–born French Egyptologist
 Charles Kuentz (soldier) (1897–2005), Alsatian centenarian and veteran of World War I
Paul Kuentz (1930–?), French conductor 

German-language surnames